Rory Anthony Graves (born July 21, 1963) is a former American football offensive tackle in the National Football League.

Graves was born in Atlanta, Georgia.  He was signed by the Los Angeles Raiders as an undrafted free agent in 1988. He played college football at Ohio State.

Graves also played for the Minnesota Vikings.

1963 births
Living people
American football offensive tackles
Ohio State Buckeyes football players
Los Angeles Raiders players
Minnesota Vikings players